Espen Bugge Pettersen (born 10 May 1980) is a Norwegian former footballer who played as a goalkeeper. He was capped seven times for the Norway national team. Bugge Pettersen is currently managing director at Sandefjord Fotball.

Club career

Early career
Bugge Pettersen started his career in the local clubs Tønsberg FK and Eik-Tønsberg, and moved to Sandefjord Fotball before the 2002season. In the nine seasons he played in Sandefjord, he played 240 of 250 possible league matches.

Molde
On 31 July 2010, it was announced that Bugge Pettersen was sold from Sandefjord to Molde FK, signing a -year contract. In his second season in Molde, he won the league championship with Ole Gunnar Solskjær as manager, and won the Kniksen award as the best goalkeeper in Tippeligaen.
Bugge Pettersen played 123 consecutive first-team matches for Sandefjord and Molde, from he missed the Tippeliga-match against Start on 1 October 2007, until Solskjær decided to let the second-choice goalkeeper, Elias Valderhaug, play the last two league-games after Molde won Tippeligaen in 2011.

Strømsgodset
On 12 December 2014, Bugge Pettersen signed a two-year contract with Strømsgodset.

International career
He made his international debut on 29 May 2010 against Montenegro, when he replaced Rune Jarstein as a substitute in the 89th minute. The last couple of years, Bugge Pettersen have been Norway's second-choice goalkeeper, with Rune Jarstein being the first choice. As of November 2012 he has been capped seven times, and he started his first international game in a friendly matches against Thailand on 18 January 2012.

Personal life
Espen Bugge Pettersen is married to Lene Syversen, and together they have two children Storm and Pernille.

Career statistics
Source:

Honours
Molde
 Tippeligaen: 2011, 2012, 2014

Individual
Kniksen Goalkeeper of the Year: 2011

References

Profile at Sandefjord Fotball's official website

External links

1980 births
Living people
Sportspeople from Tønsberg
Norwegian footballers
Norway international footballers
Eik-Tønsberg players
Sandefjord Fotball players
Molde FK players
Strømsgodset Toppfotball players
Norwegian First Division players
Eliteserien players
Association football goalkeepers
Sandefjord Fotball non-playing staff